Nora Waln (1895 – 27 September 1964) was a best-selling American writer and journalist in the 1930s–50s, writing books and articles on her time spent in Germany and China. She was among the first to report on the spread of Nazism from 1934 to 1938. She traveled widely in Europe and Asia, contributing articles to the Atlantic Monthly and other magazines. She was one of the few correspondents who reported from Communist China and Mongolia, reporting for the Saturday Evening Post for three and a half years, including reporting from the Korean War (1947-1951). She regularly contributed to the Atlantic Monthly from 1925 to 1962.

Early years
She was the daughter of Thomas Lincoln and Lillian Quest Waln, from a Pennsylvanian Quaker family.

In 1918, she was Publicity Secretary of the American Committee for Armenian and Syrian Relief (later the Near East Foundation) and contributed a foreword to the book Ravished Armenia.

From childhood, she was interested in Chinese culture after learning of a family trading-connection with the Lin family of Hopei Province from the early 19th-century.

China
Having made contact with the family, she left Swarthmore College before graduating, and in 1920, set out for China.

She ended up living for 12 years in the Lin household as a "daughter of affection" and developed this experience into her acclaimed memoir House of Exile, which was published in 1933. This gave readers an insiders look at Chinese culture and customs in a time of change following the overthrow of the Qing dynasty. The family was considered "exiles" because a Lin had been ordered by thirteenth-century Mongol Emperor Kublai Khan to help work with the Grand Canal in Hopei, and had moved North from the family's Canton homestead.

House of Exile sold well in England and America, as did French and German translations.

Marriage
While living in China, Waln met and married George Edward Osland-Hill, an English official in the Chinese Post Office, in 1922.

Ted Osland-Hill had one daughter from a previous marriage. She was Marie Osland-Hill, later Marie Wade.

Dialogue from Reaching for the Stars (Cresset Press, 1939) pp. 2–3

Germany
From 30 June 1934 to April 1938, she and her husband lived in Germany. She was moved to write Reaching for the Stars, completing it on Christmas Day, 1938. It was published in London by the Cresset Press and in Boston, USA by Little, Brown and Co.in April 1939. It sold well in England and America.

The book recounts the spread of Hitler's Nazi movement against a backdrop of her despair for the changes in a people she loved. In spite of the horror which she saw and described, she felt that the German people would revolt against Nazism.

Her damning exposé of Nazi Germany was a bestseller in the US in 1939 (ahead of Mein Kampf),. The book was reissued in paperback by Soho Press in 1992 under a new title, The Approaching Storm: One Woman's Story of Germany, 1934-1938.

After the war, she returned to Germany and attended the Nuremberg Trials

After Germany
In Britain, during the War, she served on the China Convoy Committee of Friends Ambulance Unit

After the end of the War, she traveled the world, filing stories for several prominent magazines. She returned to America, several times, to speak on the Chautauqua-Redpath circuit. Fliers for her tours in 1946, 1952  and 1955  survive in the organisation's archives now held by the University of Iowa Library.

A brochure for her 1952 speaking tour of the America states:

and continues:

The brochure for her 1946 tour  says: "During the war, she spoke extensively to large audiences throughout England and Scotland". Presumably this was between 1938, when she moved from Germany to her home on Buckinghamshire  and the USA entering the war in 1942. Her Who's who entry says her career included administering Kappa Kappa Gamma Fund for bombed mothers and children since 1940 and Membership of the council, American Outpost in Britain. These activities presumably started during the 1939-1945 war.

The brochure for her 1955 tour gives more details of her travels:

In 1947, she was awarded the King Haakon VII Freedom Cross by the Government of Norway.

In 1956, she received the Distinguished Daughter of Pennsylvania Award.
  
Nora Waln died on 27 September 1964. Her husband had died on 5 January 1958.

Publications

  The Street of Precious Pearls; New York, The Woman's Press, 1921, 96 pp. Available online  on the Internet Archive website.
 The House of Exile, with illustrations by C. Le Roy Baldridge.; Boston, Little, Brown, and Company, 1933.

 La Maison d'exil. Mœurs et vie intime en Chine moderne. Traduction de Michel Epuy; Genève, 1934
 Süsse frucht, bittre frucht, China [House of Exile]; translated by L. Günther and Josephine Ewers-Bumiller, Berlin : W. Krüger, 1935
 Sommer in der Mongolei; Berlin : W. Krüger, 1936 "Aus dem englischen manuskript übersetzt von Josephine Ewers-Bumiller und L. Günther"
 Reaching for the stars Boston, Little, Brown and Company; 1939. Available online  on the Internet Archive website.
 Reaching for the stars London, Cresset Press, 1939
  Reaching for the stars Australia, Lothian/Penguin books 1942
 Het huis van ballingschap; translated by Pauline Moody; Amsterdam: Meulenhoff, 1982. 
 The House of Exile ; with illustrations by C. Leroy Baldridge. Supplemental ed., New York : Soho Press, c1992.  Paperback 0939149788. Includes 5 chapters of Return to the House of Exile, written in 1947–1958; that book was never published separately. Review in Publishers weekly here.
 The Approaching Storm: One Woman's Story of Germany, 1934-1938 London : Cresset Library, 1988.  (paperback.) Series: Cresset women's voices [Reaching for the Stars retitled]
 The Approaching Storm: One Woman's Story of Germany, 1934-1938; New York : Soho, 1993. . Paperback 0939149818 [Reaching for the Stars retitled]
 Surrender the Heart ?1961 - publication details not available. Mentioned in Friends Historical Library's listing of Research Papers.
 Sliding Doors appears to be another bibliographic ghost. The Speaking Tour brochure, cited above, states: "Her most recent book. Sliding Doors, which deals with her last 3 1/2 years in the Orient, will be published in the fall of 1952 by the Atlantic Monthly". No evidence of its publication has been traced.

Notes

External links 
 
 .
 Pennsylvania center for the book: biography of Nora Waln
 Nora Waln papers at the historical library of Swarthmore College
 BBC Video clip: Nora Waln's view of pre-war Germany.

1895 births
1964 deaths
20th-century American non-fiction writers
20th-century American women writers
American expatriates in China
American expatriates in Germany
American magazine journalists
American Quakers
American women journalists
Recipients of the King Haakon VII Freedom Cross
The Atlantic (magazine) people
The Saturday Evening Post people